Still Cruisin' is the twenty-sixth studio album by the Beach Boys, their thirty-fifth official album (counting compilations and live packages), and their last release of the 1980s.  It is also the last album of new material released during a brief return to Capitol Records.

Released August 28, 1989, the album was panned by critics, with Allmusic referring to the band's sound by producer Terry Melcher as sounding "like a professional '60s cover band." Despite the poor critical reception, the album was Certified Gold by RIAA in 1989 and has since gone on to be Certified Platinum for sales of 1,000,000 copies. 

Still Cruisin' was left out of Capitol's Beach Boys re-issue campaign in 2000 and 2001, along with their following album Summer in Paradise.

Background
After "Kokomo" (when released as a single from the Cocktail film soundtrack) gave the Beach Boys their first number one hit in the US since 1966's "Good Vibrations", the band decided to put together an album of recent and classic songs. The classic songs included had been heard in recent films. The songs "Still Cruisin'", "Somewhere Near Japan" and "Island Girl" were recorded for the album by the touring Beach Boys band as well as studio musicians and producer Terry Melcher.  Due to his ongoing relationship with Dr. Eugene Landy, Brian Wilson's lone contribution to this album was "In My Car", a song credited as being co-written by Landy and girlfriend Alexandra Morgan. However, as subsequent court actions have seen Landy's name removed from other period songs, such as those on Wilson's 1988 album, these credits may be negated. "Kokomo" was a recent single, as was "Wipe Out", a duet with American rap group the Fat Boys. (The song was originally to be recorded with Run-DMC, but Mike Love apparently struck a deal with the other group.) "Make It Big" was recorded for the film Troop Beverly Hills, and the remaining three songs - "I Get Around", "Wouldn't It Be Nice" and "California Girls" – were the "classic" recordings, ones from the group's earlier period, that had been used in recent films. The inclusion of these hits gave the album a more acceptable running time.

Mike Love said of the album: "The theme of that album was to have been songs that have been in movies. It was basically a repackage. But then it got watered down with politics, meaning Brian's Dr. Landy forcing a song called "In My Car," which was never in a movie, and a song by [Al] Jardine, which ultimately ended up on the album, called "Island Girl," which was never in a movie either. So to me the concept was a little bit diluted there politically."

Riding on the coattails of "Kokomo", Still Cruisin'  went gold in the US and Austria and gave the Beach Boys their best chart showing since 1976.  During Capitol's Beach Boys re-issue campaign in 2000 and 2001 however, Still Cruisin'  was left behind and allowed to go out of print.

Promotional videos
Four music videos were produced for Still Cruisin: 
"Still Cruisin'"
"Somewhere Near Japan"
"Kokomo"
"Wipe Out"

Track listing
Side one

Side two

Singles
 "Kokomo" b/w "Tutti Frutti" (Little Richard) (Elektra), July 18, 1988 US #1; UK #25 "Still Cruisin' " b/w "Kokomo" (Capitol), August 7, 1989 US #93'''
 "Somewhere Near Japan" b/w "Wipe Out"  (Capitol), January 1990Still Cruisin (Capitol) reached #46''' in the U.S. during a chart stay of 22 weeks. It reached number 12 in Austria number 25 in Switzerland and number 43 in Sweden.

Personnel 

Partial credits; credits exclude those for the 1960s songs.

The Beach Boys
 Mike Love – lead and backing vocals
 Al Jardine – lead and backing vocals, guitar
 Carl Wilson – lead and backing vocals, guitar, keyboards
 Bruce Johnston – lead and backing vocals, keyboards, bass guitar
 Brian Wilson – lead and backing vocals; keyboards and synthesizers on "In My Car"

Additional musicians
 The Fat Boys – rapping on "Wipe Out"
 Craig Trippand Fall – lead guitar on "Still Crusin'" and "Somewhere Near Japan," bass guitar, mandolin
 Joseph Brasler – lead guitar on "In My Car"
 Keith Wechsler – drums and keyboards on "Still Cruisin'"
 Mike Kowalski – drums on “Island Girl”
 Vinnie Colaiuta – drums on "In My Car"
 Jeffrey Foskett – backing vocals on “Island Girl” and acoustic guitar on "Kokomo"
 Jim Keltner – drums on "Somewhere Near Japan" and "Kokomo"
 Van Dyke Parks – accordion on "Kokomo"
 Rod Clark – bass on "Kokomo"
 Joel Peskin – saxophone on “Kokomo”
 Chili Charles – percussion on "Kokomo"
 "Vince," "Milton," and "Mike" (last names unknown) – steel drums on "Kokomo"
 Adam Jardine – backing vocals on “Island Girl”
 Matt Jardine – backing vocals on “Island Girl”
 James Grunke – synth programming on “Island Girl”
 Michael Bernard – synth programming on “In My Car”

Chart positions

Certifications

References

External links

The Beach Boys albums
1989 albums
Capitol Records albums
Albums produced by Terry Melcher
Albums produced by Brian Wilson
Albums produced by Al Jardine